Chettiar (also spelt as Chetti and  Chetty) is a title used by many traders, weaving, agricultural and land-owning castes in South India, especially in the states of Tamil Nadu, Kerala and Karnataka.

Etymology 

See also 
 Nagarathar
 Vallanattu Chettiar
 Twenty four Manai Telugu Chettiars
 Devanga Chettiar
 Pattanavar
 Chitty
 Kandangi sari
 Pattusali

References

Further reading 
 Christine Dobson, Asian Entrepreneurial Minorities,  Curzon Press UK, 1996. (A chapter in the book is devoted to the Chettiars who set up businesses in Burma.)
 Rajeswary Brown (1993) "Chettiar capital and Southeast Asian credit networks in the inter-war period". In G. Austin and K. Sugihara, eds. Local Suppliers of Credit in the Third World, 1750-1960. (New York: St. Martin's Press).

 David Rudner (1989) Banker's Trust and the Culture of Banking among the Nattukottai Chettiars of Colonial South India. Modern Asian Studies 23 (3), 417-458.
 Heiko Schrader (1996) Chettiar Finance in Colonial Asia. Zeitschrift fur Ethnologie 121, 101-126.

 
Social groups of Kerala
Indian surnames
Sri Lankan Tamil society
Social groups of Tamil Nadu
Indian castes
Merchant castes
Agricultural castes
Bania communities